In geometry, Villarceau circles are a pair of circles produced by cutting a torus obliquely through the center at a special angle. 

Given an arbitrary point on a torus, four circles can be drawn through it. One is in a plane parallel to the equatorial plane of the torus and another perpendicular to that plane (these are analogous to lines of latitude and longitude on the Earth). The other two are Villarceau circles. They are obtained as the intersection of the torus with a plane that passes through the center of the torus and touches it tangentially at two antipodal points. If one considers all these planes, one obtains two families of circles on the torus. Each of these families consists of disjoint circles that cover each point of the torus exactly once and thus forms a 1-dimensional foliation of the torus.

The Villarceau circles are named after the French astronomer and mathematician Yvon Villarceau (1813–1883) who wrote about them in 1848. 

Mannheim (1903) showed that the Villarceau circles meet all of the parallel circular cross-sections of the torus at the same angle, a result that he said a Colonel Schoelcher had presented at a congress in 1891.

Example
Consider a horizontal torus in xyz space, centered at the origin and with major radius 5 and minor radius 3. That means that the torus is the locus of some vertical circles of radius three whose centers are on a circle of radius five in the horizontal xy plane. Points on this torus satisfy this equation:

Slicing with the z = 0 plane produces two concentric circles, x2 + y2 = 22 and x2 + y2 = 82, the outer and inner equator. Slicing with the x = 0 plane produces two side-by-side circles, (y − 5)2 + z2 = 32 and (y + 5)2 + z2 = 32.

Two example Villarceau circles can be produced by slicing with the plane 3x = 4z. One is centered at (0, +3, 0) and the other at (0, −3, 0); both have radius five. They can be written in parametric form as

and

The slicing plane is chosen to be tangent to the torus at two points while passing through its center. It is tangent at (16⁄5, 0, 12⁄5) and at (−16⁄5, 0, −12⁄5). The angle of slicing is uniquely determined by the dimensions of the chosen torus. Rotating any one such plane around the z-axis gives all of the Villarceau circles for that torus.

Existence and equations

A proof of the circles’ existence can be constructed from the fact that the slicing plane is tangent to the torus at two points. One characterization of a torus is that it is a surface of revolution. Without loss of generality, choose a coordinate system so that the axis of revolution is the z axis. Begin with a circle of radius r in the xz plane, centered at (R, 0, 0).

Sweeping replaces x by (x2 + y2)1/2, and clearing the square root produces a quartic equation.

The cross-section of the swept surface in the xz plane now includes a second circle.

This pair of circles has two common internal tangent lines, with slope at the origin found from the right triangle with hypotenuse R and opposite side r (which has its right angle at the point of tangency). Thus z/x equals ±r / (R2 − r2)1/2, and choosing the plus sign produces the equation of a plane bitangent to the torus.

By symmetry, rotations of this plane around the z axis give all the bitangent planes through the center. (There are also horizontal planes tangent to the top and bottom of the torus, each of which gives a “double circle”, but not Villarceau circles.)

We can calculate the intersection of the plane(s) with the torus analytically, and thus show that the result is a symmetric pair of circles, one of which is a circle of radius R centered at

A treatment along these lines can be found in Coxeter (1969).

A more abstract — and more flexible — approach was described by Hirsch (2002), using algebraic geometry in a projective setting. In the homogeneous quartic equation for the torus,

setting w to zero gives the intersection with the “plane at infinity”, and reduces the equation to

This intersection is a double point, in fact a double point counted twice. Furthermore, it is included in every bitangent plane. The two points of tangency are also double points. Thus the intersection curve, which theory says must be a quartic, contains four double points. But we also know that a quartic with more than three double points must factor (it cannot be irreducible), and by symmetry the factors must be two congruent conics. Hirsch extends this argument to any surface of revolution generated by a conic, and shows that intersection with a bitangent plane must produce two conics of the same type as the generator when the intersection curve is real.

Filling space
The torus plays a central role in the Hopf fibration of the 3-sphere, S3, over the ordinary sphere, S2, which has circles, S1, as fibers. When the 3-sphere is mapped to Euclidean 3-space by stereographic projection, the inverse image of a circle of latitude on S2 under the fiber map is a torus, and the fibers themselves are Villarceau circles. Banchoff has explored such a torus with computer graphics imagery. One of the unusual facts about the circles is that each links through all the others, not just in its own torus but in the collection filling all of space; Berger has a discussion and drawing.

See also
 Toric section
 Vesica piscis

Citations

References

External links

Flat Torus in the Three-Sphere
  The circles of the torus (Les cercles du tore)

Circles
Toric sections
Fiber bundles